The 10th South-West Qiwang began in March 2011 and concluded on 11 March 2011. The winner was Gu Lingyi, who defeated Dang Yifei in the final for his fourth South-West Qiwang title.

Tournament

References

2011 in go
Go competitions in China